Anti-Arabism in Turkey is opposition, hostility, hatred, distrust, fear, and general dislike of Arabs or Arab culture in Turkey. Turkey has a history of strong anti-Arabism dating back to the Ottoman Empire, which has risen significantly in recent years because of the Syrian refugee crisis.

Anti-Arabism in the Ottoman Empire 
The Ottoman Empire was a multi-cultural empire. Most high government positions were held by non-Arab people, except for the Emirate of Hejaz under Ottoman rule.

Modern anti-Arabism 
Haaretz reported that anti-Arabian racism in Turkey mainly affects two groups; tourists from the Gulf who are characterized as "rich and condescending" and the Syrian refugees in Turkey. Haaretz also reported that anti-Syrian sentiment in Turkey is metastasizing into a general hostility toward all Arabs including the Palestinians. 

Ümit Özdağ, the former deputy Chairman of the Good Party, warned that Turkey risked becoming "a Middle Eastern country" because of the influx of refugees.

Depiction of Arabs in Turkey 
Due to long historical anti-Arabism in the Ottoman Empire and subsequent Arab Revolt as a result, there is a strong negative depiction which was dated from Kemalist Turkey in 1930s, associating Arabs with backwardness.  has continued influencing modern Turkish historiography and the crusade of Turkish soft power, with Arabs being frequently stereotyped as "evil, uncivilized, terrorists, incompetent, stupid, greedy", etc. This depiction is frequently used in contrast to the alleged depiction of Turkic people as "noble, generous, fearsome, loyal, brave and spirited warriors".

Anti-Arab sentiment is also further fueled by ultranationalist groups, including the Grey Wolves and pan-Turkist nationalist parties, who called for invasions on the Arab World's Syria and Iraq, to prevent the alleged ongoing Arab persecutions of its Turkic populations in many Arab countries of the Middle East.

Growing influx of Arab refugees in Turkey led to a serious wave of anti-Arabism.

Syrian Arabs
Syrian Arabs are the most frequent targets in Turkey. With the Syrian Civil War that started in 2011, Syrians who came to Turkey are exposed to discrimination in many areas. According to researcher Şenay Özden, racist attitudes and discourses towards Syrians in Turkey increased with the thought that refugees are permanent in Turkey. 92% of Syrians living in Turkey state that they are exposed to discrimination.

In the research conducted by the International Organization for Migration with 636 people, it was determined that nearly half of the participants saw the Syrians as a "less talented race". In addition, one third of the participants stated that they believe that Syrian refugees are not victims of war. Although more than half of the participants stated that they encounter Syrians every day, only 22% of them declared that they had any contact with Syrians.

Economic problems and unemployment in Turkey are associated with Syrian refugees by some. It is stated that these problems strengthen the negative perspective towards Syrians and trigger racism more. Researches reveal that the economically weak part of the public, in particular, sees Syrian refugees as the chief culprit of economic problems. Reports stating that anti-Syrian sentiment is most intensely carried out by those with a weak economic situation, show that the main reason for this is mostly Syrian refugees working in sectors that require cheap labor.

There is a correlation between racist violence attempts against Syrians and Syrians working informally. Anti-Syrian sentiment has increased during election periods. Political parties' making political announcements and statements over Syrians as a voting tool is directly related to the racist attacks that Syrians are exposed to. 

Within the realm of social media, immigration attitudes tend to align with the concept of "welfare chauvinism," where Turkish citizens are viewed as deserving priority access to government-provided social benefits. The onset of the COVID-19 pandemic has catalyzed this sentiment, leading to exclusionary attitudes towards immigrants. Additionally, public declarations from policymakers touting generous public spending towards immigrants have evoked negative reactions among social media users. Nativist sentiments that incorporate a patronizing tolerance towards immigrants bear a striking resemblance to social dynamics observed in societies that are ethnically or racially divided. Adopting a supremacist ethos, such sentiments offer limited inclusion to migrants, but only under stringent conditions. Above all else, immigrants are expected to exhibit docility to such a degree that they must remain silent on political matters that have a direct impact on their lives and futures. Furthermore, immigrants are expected to overtly express their gratitude. In recent times, the public sentiment on Syrian immigrants in Turkish social media has shifted towards a more positive outlook. This shift coincided with Turkish forces launching a cross-border operation in Syria, followed by Turkish authorities opening the European border for Syrian immigrants. This trend suggests that refugees and immigrants are viewed as instruments to embarrass the rhetorical enemy of Turkish civilizationism, namely Western civilization or Europe. While refugees and immigrants serve this purpose well, the ultimate decision to remain or depart rests with them. Hence, the notion of patronizing tolerance serves as a pervasive theme in the context of immigrant-host society relationships in Turkey.

There are also those who hold Syrian refugees responsible for the increase in rents and the increase in prices in the markets. According to Metin Çorabatır, head of the Center for Asylum and Migration Studies, the reason for this prejudice and racist attitudes towards Syrians is misinformation on social media. In addition, non-governmental organizations and researchers state that the language and style used for Syrians in the news given by the media trigger racist attacks and behaviors against Syrians, and they accuse anti-Syrian social media posts. The lack of transparency in the aid provided by the state to the Syrians increases the hate speech in the society.

In line with the above, according to a study conducted in Gaziantep in 2021, it was determined that the biggest concern among Syrians was racism and economic problems. Similarly, according to Metin Çorabatır of the Center for Asylum and Migration Studies, all Syrians in Turkey are exposed to racist rhetoric and actions.

Teachers state that some of the Syrian students are constantly in the psychology of exclusion and oppression, and accordingly, behaviors that transcend the limits in rulelessness are observed. Teachers who work in schools with Syrians and have burnout syndrome state that violence at school has increased.

See also 
Anti-Arabism
Racism and discrimination in Turkey
Anti-Armenian sentiment in Turkey
Anti-Arabism in Kurdistan
Human rights in Turkey
Refugees of the Syrian Civil War in Turkey

References 

Turkey
Racism in Turkey